Odesa Museum of Western and Eastern Art is a museum of Fine Arts on Pushkin street in Odesa, Ukraine.

Description
The museum was founded in 1923 and it is housed in a palace that was constructed between 1856 and 1858 to a design by the architect L.Otton. The museum's collection was created from previously private collections that were augmented by artefacts from the City Museum of Fine Arts and University of Odesa.

The museum has a large collection, not all of which is on show, including works by Caravaggio, Gerard David, Jan van Scorel, Rubens, Abraham Bloemaert, Frans Hals, and others. Its storerooms became known when two tronies by the painter Frans Hals were discovered languishing there in 1958 by Irina Linnik, who recognized them as the lost paintings by Hals of the evangelists Luke and Matthew. These two were once part of a foursome described in 18th-century auction documents. She traced their history back to the 17th century, and after her work was published in 1959, the other two of John and Mark were also rediscovered. Art of China, Japan, India, Iran and Tibet is represented in the Eastern halls of the museum. The collection includes silk paintings, porcelain, amazing embroideries, ancient weaponry, statuettes and other items from the XVI-XVII centuries.

Collection

References

External links 
 Official website 
 Official website (old) 
 Official Facebook Page 

Museums in Odesa
Art museums and galleries in Ukraine
Pushkinska Street, Odesa